The Ruchi is a mountain in the Glarus Alps, located at an elevation of  on the border between the Swiss cantons of Glarus and Graubünden. It overlooks the Muttsee on its west side from where a trail leads to the summit. On its south-east side lies a small glacier, the Glatscher da Gavirolas.

The nearest settlements are the villages of Linthal to the north, and Andiast to the south. Administratively, the mountain lies in the municipalities of Glarus Süd and Waltensburg/Vuorz.

References

External links

Ruchi on Hikr
Ruchi on Peakbagger

Mountains of the Alps
Alpine three-thousanders
Mountains of Switzerland
Mountains of the canton of Glarus
Mountains of Graubünden
Glarus–Graubünden border
Breil/Brigels